In five-dimensional geometry, a truncated 5-cube is a convex uniform 5-polytope, being a truncation of the regular 5-cube.

There are four unique truncations of the 5-cube. Vertices of the truncated 5-cube are located as pairs on the edge of the 5-cube. Vertices of the bitruncated 5-cube are located on the square faces of the 5-cube. The third and fourth truncations are more easily constructed as second and first truncations of the 5-orthoplex.

Truncated 5-cube

Alternate names
 Truncated penteract (Acronym: tan) (Jonathan Bowers)

Construction and coordinates

A regular 5-cell is formed at each truncated vertex.

The Cartesian coordinates of the vertices of a truncated 5-cube having edge length 2 are all permutations of:

Images 
The truncated 5-cube is constructed by a truncation applied to the 5-cube. All edges are shortened, and two new vertices are added on each original edge.

Related polytopes 
The truncated 5-cube, is fourth in a sequence of truncated hypercubes:

Bitruncated 5-cube

Alternate names
 Bitruncated penteract (Acronym: bittin) (Jonathan Bowers)

Construction and coordinates

The Cartesian coordinates of the vertices of a bitruncated 5-cube having edge length 2 are all permutations of:

Images

Related polytopes 
The bitruncated 5-cube is third in a sequence of bitruncated hypercubes:

Related polytopes

This polytope is one of 31 uniform 5-polytope generated from the regular 5-cube or 5-orthoplex.

Notes

References 
 H.S.M. Coxeter: 
 H.S.M. Coxeter, Regular Polytopes, 3rd Edition, Dover New York, 1973 
 Kaleidoscopes: Selected Writings of H.S.M. Coxeter, edited by F. Arthur Sherk, Peter McMullen, Anthony C. Thompson, Asia Ivic Weiss, Wiley-Interscience Publication, 1995,  
 (Paper 22) H.S.M. Coxeter, Regular and Semi Regular Polytopes I, [Math. Zeit. 46 (1940) 380-407, MR 2,10]
 (Paper 23) H.S.M. Coxeter, Regular and Semi-Regular Polytopes II, [Math. Zeit. 188 (1985) 559-591]
 (Paper 24) H.S.M. Coxeter, Regular and Semi-Regular Polytopes III, [Math. Zeit. 200 (1988) 3-45]
 Norman Johnson Uniform Polytopes, Manuscript (1991)
 N.W. Johnson: The Theory of Uniform Polytopes and Honeycombs, Ph.D. 
  o3o3o3x4x - tan, o3o3x3x4o - bittin

External links 
 Polytopes of Various Dimensions
 Multi-dimensional Glossary

5-polytopes